SIG was a pop band from Raisio, Finland, formed in 1978. The lead singer of the band was Matti Inkinen. The breakthrough song SIG was "Tiina menee naimisiin" (Tiina is getting married).
The most famous songs from SIG are “Vuosisadan rakkaustarina“ and “Hyvää syntymäpäivää“. Original SIG broke down in 1987. The comeback album of SIG was "Suomalainen pop-levy" (A Finnish Pop Album). The lead singer of SIG Matti Inkinen died in 2009.

Discography

 Matkalla maineeseen (1980) (In a Way to Fame)
 Sudet (1981) (Wolves)
 Vuosisadan rakkaustarina (1982) (The Lovestory of the Century)
 Syke (1984) (Beat)
 Unelmia (1985) (Dreams)
 Purppura (1986) (Purple)
 Rakkauden sävel (1995) (Melody of Love)
 Kansanlauluja kaupungeista (1998) (Folk Songs from Cities)
 Suomalainen pop-levy (2003) (Finnish pop Album)

Members

1978–1979

 Matti Inkinen (vocals)
 Timo Kilpinen (guitar)
 Moko Karttunen (bass)
 Matti Ranta (drums)
 Juha Oksanen (keyboard)

1979–1981

 Matti Inkinen (vocals)
 Timo Kilpinen (guitar, bass)
 Rauno Linja-aho (guitar)
 Ari Hemmilä (bass)
 Matti Ranta (drums)
 Juha Oksanen (keyboard)

1981–1987

 Matti Inkinen (vocals)
 Rauno Linja-aho (guitar)
 Ari Hemmilä (bass)
 Jukka Merisaari (drums)
 Juha Oksanen (keyboard)

1995–1996

 Matti Inkinen (vocals)
 Erkka Makkonen (guitar)
 Karhu Hiltunen (bass)
 Eero Valkonen (drums)
 Seppo Wahl (keyboard)

1997–1999
 Matti Inkinen (vocals)
 Jukka Vehkala (guitar)
 Karhu Hiltunen (bass)
 Teppo Seppänen (guitar, drums)

2000

 Matti Inkinen (vocals)
 Erkka Makkonen (guitar)
 Ari Hemmilä (bass)
 Jukka Merisaari (drums)
 Juha Oksanen (keyboard)

2003–2009
 Matti Inkinen (vocals)
 Erkka Makkonen (guitar)
 Jouni Salovaara (bass)
 Jukka Merisaari (drums)
 Juha Oksanen (keyboard)

2009–
 Erkka Makkonen (guitar)
 Jouni Salovaara (bass)
 Jukka Merisaari (drums)
 Juha Oksanen (keyboard)

External links
 Official website

Finnish musical groups